Two ships of the Royal Navy have borne the name HMS Loyal:

 was a  destroyer, originally built as HMS Orlando, but renamed before being launched in 1913. She was sold in 1921.
 was an L-class destroyer launched in 1941 and sold in 1948.

Other ships
A number of ships of the Royal Navy have used 'Loyal' as part of their name, including:
HMS Loyal Example, entered service as 
HMS Loyal Exploit, entered service as 
HMS Loyal Explorer, entered service as 
HMS Loyal Express, entered service as

See also

Royal Navy ship names